Taean Thermal Power Station is a large coal-fired power station in Taean, South Korea, owned by Korean Western Power Co, part of Korea Electric Power Corporation. Second largest coal plant in the world it is estimated to have been the coal-fired power plant which emitted the fourth most carbon dioxide in 2018, at 31 million tons, and relative emissions are estimated at 1.5 kg per kWh. The government asked the company to voluntarily cut coal-fired generation in 2021, which they did. There is a pilot plant for coal gasification.

See also 
 List of coal power stations

References 

Coal-fired power stations in South Korea
Taean County